Twenty railway station served the village of Twenty, Lincolnshire. It was on the route of the Spalding and Bourne Railway (opened 1866),  later part of the Midland and Eastern Railway and then part of the Midland and Great Northern Joint Railway main line between the Midlands and the Norfolk Coast.

History

The station opened with the line on 1 August 1866, closed temporarily between 9 October 1880 and 1 February 1881, and closed permanently on 2 March 1959, although the line remained open for goods until 1964.

The former station buildings are still extant, unusually for this line, and in use as commercial premises by a well-respected Double Glazing company.

References

External links
 Twenty station on 1946 O. S. map

Railway stations in Great Britain opened in 1866
Railway stations in Great Britain closed in 1959
Former Midland and Great Northern Joint Railway stations
Disused railway stations in Lincolnshire
1866 establishments in England